Ahmed Khairy (born 1 October 1987) was an Egyptian footballer.

Career
Khairy played for the Egyptian giant Al Ahly. He moved to Al Ahly in 2013's summer transfer window from Egyptian rivals Ismaily, and is a member of the Egypt national football team. He can play across the entire midfield or as a defender.

Khairy was the youngest member of the Egypt national football squad at the 2009 FIFA Confederations Cup in South Africa.

International goals

References

External links
 

1987 births
Living people
Egyptian footballers
Egypt international footballers
2009 FIFA Confederations Cup players
Association football midfielders
Al Mokawloon Al Arab SC players
Egyptian Premier League players
Al Ahly SC players
Ismaily SC players